Victor Dee Barnhart (September 1, 1922 – April 13, 2017) was an American professional baseball player who played for the Pittsburgh Pirates in the National League for parts of three season spanning 1944 to 1946. Born in Hagerstown, Maryland, he was the son of Clyde Barnhart, who had also played for the Pirates. In three seasons in the Major Leagues, he played in 74 games. He was traded to the Brooklyn Dodgers on December 3, 1947, but never took the field with them. Barnhart died on April 13, 2017 at the age of 94.

See also
List of second-generation Major League Baseball players

References

External links

1922 births
2017 deaths
Major League Baseball shortstops
Pittsburgh Pirates players
London Pirates players
Hutchinson Pirates players
Albany Senators players
Indianapolis Indians players
Montreal Royals players
Toronto Maple Leafs (International League) players
Chattanooga Lookouts players
Utica Blue Sox players
Baseball players from Maryland
Sportspeople from Hagerstown, Maryland